Rasmus Mathias Nordbø (5 February 1915  23 February 1983) was a Norwegian administrator and government minister. He served as state secretary to the Minister of Agriculture in the second cabinet of Einar Gerhardsen (1948-1951), and later himself as Minister of Agriculture in the cabinet of Oscar Torp (1951-1955).

Later Nordbø was County Minister of Agriculture for Sogn og Fjordane from 1955 to 1964, when he was given the same post for the county of Vestfold. He also served as a member of the municipal council of Førde.

References

1915 births
1983 deaths
Ministers of Agriculture and Food of Norway